In mathematics, a partial group algebra is an associative algebra related to the partial representations of a group.

Examples 
 The partial group algebra  is isomorphic to the direct sum:

See also 
 Group ring
 Group representation

Notes

References 
 

Algebras
Representation theory of groups